Werner Otto may refer to:
Werner Otto (entrepreneur) (1909–2011), founder of Otto GmbH
Werner Otto (cyclist) (born 1948), retired track cyclist
Werner Otto (footballer) (born 1929), international footballer